The San Diego Padres are a professional baseball franchise based in San Diego, California.

They began play in 1969, but did not achieve their first winning season until 1978, though they failed to sustain this over the next half-decade. However, in 1984 the Padres surprisingly reached their first-ever postseason appearance and won the National League Championship before losing to a very strong Detroit Tigers team in the World Series.

This did not usher in a prolonged period of success for the Padres, who failed to achieve a second postseason appearance until 1996, and after a disappointing 1997 they rebounded again with a franchise-best 98 wins and reached the World Series only to face another exceptionally formidable opponent in the late-1990s Yankees dynasty. The Padres yet again faltered, but achieved four consecutive winning seasons for the only time in franchise history between 2004 and 2007 without winning more than one playoff game. In 2020, the Padres returned to the postseason for the first time since 2006 but they were swept by the eventual 2020 World Series champions Los Angeles Dodgers in the 2020 NLDS.

Regular season record-by-year

Since 1969, the Padres have had eighteen seasons in which they have finished with a win percentage of .500 or better. During only seven of those years, the team has made playoff appearances, including during the shortened 2020 season due to the ongoing COVID-19 pandemic. The Padres, on October 2, 2022, clinched a berth in the National League Wild-Card series, following a 4-3 twelfth-inning loss by the Milwaukee Brewers to the Miami Marlins.

The Padres finished tied with the Colorado Rockies for the wild card spot. Colorado defeated San Diego 9–8, in a one-game playoff to clinch the wild card spot.

Record by decade 
The following table describes the Padres' MLB win–loss record by decade.

These statistics are from Baseball-Reference.com's San Diego Padres History & Encyclopedia, and are current as of February 19, 2020.

Post-season record by year
The Padres have made the postseason seven times in their history, with their first being in 1984 and the most recent being in 2022.

References

 
San Diego Padres
Seasons
Events in San Diego